The term "RC-1" may refer to:

 Boeing RC-1, a concept aircraft for transporting oil and minerals
 RC-1, a remote control for the Canon EOS 100 camera.
 The first release candidate for a piece of software.